Neotessmannia is a genus of trees in the family Muntingiaceae, comprising only one species, Neotessmannia uniflora. It is native to Peru.

References

Trees of Peru
Monotypic Malvales genera
Muntingiaceae
Taxa named by Max Burret